"Mhysa" is the third season finale of the American medieval epic fantasy television series Game of Thrones, and its 30th episode overall.

The episode revolves on the aftermath of the events instigated by "The Red Wedding", in which Tywin Lannister is revealed to be the mastermind behind the massacre — with Walder Frey and Roose Bolton having conspired with the Lannisters against the Starks. As a result, House Frey receives the Seat of Riverrun and Roose Bolton is appointed the new "Warden of the North". Elsewhere, House Greyjoy begins a new military campaign. In the North, Maester Aemon sends out ravens to alert the whole of Westeros about the arrival of the White Walkers. And across the narrow sea, the freed slaves of Yunkai hail Daenerys as their "mhysa", the Old Ghiscari language's word for "mother".

According to Nielsen Media Research, "Mhysa" was seen by 5.4 million household viewers in the United States, a twenty-eight percent increase compared to the second season finale, "Valar Morghulis". After its broadcast, the episode received generally positive reviews from television critics, with some of them addressing its anticlimactic closure of the series' third season, and its establishment of potential storylines for the fourth season, such as through the final scene's "glimmer of hope". The episode received a nomination for a Primetime Emmy Award for Outstanding Cinematography for a Single-Camera Series at the 65th Primetime Creative Arts Emmy Awards.

Plot

At the Twins
The Stark army is massacred and Robb's mutilated corpse is paraded through the camp. Lord Frey, now in charge of Riverrun, and Roose Bolton, now Warden of the North, discuss recent events and Roose reveals that the Blackfish escaped. Nearby, Arya and Sandor, who witnessed the desecration of Robb's corpse earlier, pass a group of Frey soldiers who are boasting about the event. An enraged Arya suddenly stabs one soldier to death while Sandor kills the others.

In King's Landing
Tyrion learns of the Stark murders and warns Tywin that the Northerners will never forget his role. Tywin asserts his authority over Joffrey and orders Tyrion again to impregnate Sansa for the good of the family. He also belittles his son by saying that he was lucky to not be drowned at birth. Meanwhile, Varys offers Shae a sack of diamonds to sail away from King's Landing, but she refuses. Jaime arrives in King's Landing with Brienne, and he visits Cersei.

At Dragonstone
Stannis informs Davos of Robb's death and Melisandre's plans to sacrifice Gendry. Davos helps Gendry escape and Stannis orders his execution, but Davos protests, presenting Aemon's letter. Melisandre tells Stannis that only he can save the North from the White Walkers and that he will need Davos' help.

In the North
Ygritte confronts Jon while washing his wounds. He confesses his love for her but she says she knew he was an infiltrator all along. Ygritte shoots Jon with three arrows, deliberately only wounding him, before he escapes on his horse and returns to Castle Black.

At the Dreadfort, Theon begs for death and his torturer is revealed as Ramsay Snow, Roose Bolton's bastard son.

On The Iron Islands
At Pyke, Balon receives a letter from Ramsay demanding the Ironborn's withdrawal from the North, along with a box containing Theon's genitals. Balon refuses to negotiate but Yara takes 50 Ironborn to rescue him.

At The Wall
In the Nightfort, Sam's and Bran's parties meet and Sam realizes that Bran is Jon's brother. Sam warns them and gives them dragonglass weapons and guides them to the passage north. At Castle Black, Sam and Gilly meet Aemon, who sends 44 ravens with messages warning the south of the northern threat.

Outside Yunkai 
The freed slave population hail and adore Daenerys as their mhysa, Old Ghiscari for "mother".

Production

Writing
"Mhysa" was written by executive producers David Benioff and D. B. Weiss, based on George R. R. Martin's original work from his novel A Storm of Swords. Chapters adapted from A Storm of Swords to the episode were chapters 43, 49, 53 to 55, 57, 63, and 64 (Daenerys IV, Jon VI, Arya XI, Tyrion VI, Davos V, Bran IV, Jaime VII, Davos VI).

Casting
After being absent for the entire second season, Peter Vaughan returns as Maester Aemon and Josef Altin returns as Pypar. This episode also marks the return, after a long absence, of Patrick Malahide as Balon Greyjoy and Gemma Whelan as Yara Greyjoy.

Reception

Ratings
In its original American broadcast in HBO, "Mhysa" was seen by an estimated 5.4 million household viewers, according to Nielsen Media Research. It marked a year-to-year increase in viewership of 28 percent compared to the second season finale, "Valar Morghulis", which was seen by 4.2 million. The second broadcast of the "Mhysa" during the night was viewed by 900,000 viewers, bringing its total viewership for to 6.30 million. According to analysts, the success of the episode significantly helped Game of Thrones to surpass True Blood as the second most-watched series on HBO, after The Sopranos. In the United Kingdom, the episode was viewed by 1.154 million viewers, making it the highest-rated broadcast that week. It also received 0.110 million timeshift viewers.

Critical reception
"Mhysa" received generally positive reviews from television critics, with some of them addressing the finale's anticlimactic closure of the third season and for establishing new storylines for the fourth. Review aggregator Rotten Tomatoes surveyed 20 reviews of the episode and deemed 100% of them to be positive with an average score of 8.5 out of 10. The website's critical consensus reads, "'Mhysa' wraps up several of season 3's lingering storylines while subtly setting the table for season 4." James Poniewozik of Time wrote in his review, "The end of season 3, then, spent some time among the winners and losers in post-Red-Wedding Westeros, giving the audience a chance to soak in the shock, seethe at the winners' glee, and get a reminder of the larger forces – White Walkers, dragons – well beyond the war between the Lannisters and the Starks. If the Red Wedding seemed to kill hope, 'Mhysa' made clear that it didn't end anything. And it weaved together the many, many threads of GoTs tapestry by returning to a recurring theme: that Game of Thrones is ultimately about family." Matt Fowler of IGN described that the finale had "nicely set up a lot of cool stuff for Season 4, but it was also lacking some of the power and majesty of previous finales. Especially the ending with Dany, who herself had a better ending back in 'And Now His Watch is Ended' when her dragons torched Astapor and she left with a full army." He also praised the scene where Arya killed a Frey soldier. Writing for Today, Drusilla Moorhouse remarked that "After last week's shocking massacre, most fans braced for more tragic deaths in season three's finale. Instead, the blow was softened with poignant reunions and surprising saves, setting the stage for an explosive fourth season."

In her review for Zap2it, Terri Schwartz wrote that "Nothing can ever quite redeem the deaths of Robb and Catelyn Stark, but at least larger forces are taking shape that are propelling this series into Season 4. Daenerys is as powerful as she's ever been, Jon Snow returns to the Wall while Bran heads north of it and the Greyjoys ready an assault to finally save Theon from his captor. Then there's the fact that Stannis decides to sail north to the Wall to aid the Night's Watch in their fight against the White Walkers, which seems like it's going to end up being the greater, global conflict in the future of 'Game of Thrones'." Writing for The A.V. Club, David Sims gave "Mhysa" an "A−" rating, while Emily VanDerWerff gave it a "B+". Sims, writing for audiences who have not read the novels, described the episode as lacking "a lot of serious plot movement or major twists and may have fans gnashing their teeth a little bit as they wait nine months for season four. The previous season finales have also had that quality, but they each ended on a barnstorming note. 'Mhysa', not quite so much." VanDerWerff, writing for audiences who have read the novels, wrote that "On a plot level, not a lot happens in 'Mhysa'", but praised the episode in addressing the series' "value of one human life is in the face of a kingdom." She also mildly criticized the series' template of when "something terrible happens in Westeros, Dany offers a glimmer of hope over in her story line", referring to it as its "Achilles' heel". Kevin Fitzpatrick of ScreenCrush wrote in his review, "All in all, the air (or blood) of the season had mostly been let out by 'The Rains of Castamere', as even a returning Jaime’s most interesting moments arrived much earlier in the season, but 'Mhysa' gave us a good course-heading for season 4, with some much-needed catharsis along the way."

The episode's final scene, in which Daenerys, "the blondest possible savior figure", appears with "uncharacterized brown people" as "[being lifted] up as their messiah and praising her for saving them from bondage", was criticized by at least four commentators as having colonialist or even racist undertones. They asked why the series chose to portray the Yunkish as nearly uniformly dark-skinned, rather than as ethnically diverse as in the source novels, to which George R. R. Martin replied that this was because the scene was shot in Morocco with local extras. Commentators also criticized, more broadly, that the series's inclusion of people of color was limited to only a small number of characters.

References

External links

  at HBO.com
 

2013 American television episodes
Game of Thrones (season 3) episodes
Television episodes directed by David Nutter
Television episodes written by David Benioff and D. B. Weiss